The USS LSM-17 was a  of the United States Navy, commissioned at Brown Shipyards in Houston, Texas, on 14 June 1944. During the remainder of World War II, it served in the Pacific.

References

Further reading
 Stevenson, William J., and Wendy Stevenson Clem. 2001. Lucky 17: Narratives from an LSM Crew as Part of the Amphibious Navy Fleet During WWII. Roseville, MI: CNC Systems, Inc.

1944 ships
LSM-1-class landing ships medium
Ships built in Houston
World War II amphibious warfare vessels of the United States